Stade Niçois is a French amateur rugby club based in Nice, founded in 2012. It currently operates in Nationale, one division below the French professional Top14 and Pro D2 leagues.

History

The club was previously known as Rugby Nice Côte d'Azur Université-Racing. However this club was liquated in 2012.

The new club Stade Niçois was formed for the season 2012–13. They play under new colours: red, white and black.

The club won promotion from Fédérale 2 at the end of season 2017-18 and will play in Fédérale 1 for season 2018–19.

Honours
French championship:
 Runners-up: 1983
 Challenge Yves du Manoir: 
 Champions: 1985
 Challenge de l'Espérance:
 Champions: 1974,1976

Finals results

French championship

Challenge Yves du Manoir

Current standings

Women

The club includes a women's section: the Nice University Racing Rugby Club, which plays in the second division (Federale 1).

Academy

The club includes a rugby school.

Performance Pathway with the Scottish Rugby Union

On 25 July 2017, the Scottish Rugby Union announced a 'Performance Pathway' partnership with Stade Niçois.

As part of this partnership, former Scotland international rugby union players Peter Murchie and  Tyrone Holmes joined the French club. Peter Murchie joined as a coach, while Tyrone Holmes joined as a Strength and Conditioning Coach.

Two Glasgow Warriors players from the Scottish Rugby Academy; fly-half Josh Henderson and flanker Bruce Flockhart were loaned to the club for game time for the season 2017–18. In addition, former London Scottish player David Cherry also joined the club. although he later moved back to Edinburgh.

Notable former players

Internationalists

References

Rugby clubs established in 2012
French rugby union clubs
2012 establishments in France
Sport in Nice